Like a traditional condominium, a car condo is real estate where the owner owns or leases the unit where the car is stored.  The common areas of the car condo building are jointly owned by all the tenants and the car condo owner pays a monthly maintenance fee for their use.

Car condos allow the usage of units for more than just storage, allowing a mixture of business, pleasure and car storage. Some customers customize their "garage" in order to give it a personal touch. Others are running their business which cater to servicing the stored vehicles.

Car condo developers are marketing their projects to the following demographic:

 A classic car owner who wishes to store "his/her" vehicle in an optimum environment.
 A person who has a secondary residence in a popular vacation destination (e.g., South Florida, Las Vegas, Scottsdale) and wishes to keep a car year-round at that destination.
 A resident of an urban area (e.g., New York City) where parking a car is extremely expensive and where the car owner wishes a property interest in return for the large monthly parking outlay.

Car condos range in price based on location, size, features and services.

High-end luxury car condos are based more on a country club approach and serve their members.  Some are centered on racing, R&D, motorsports and philanthropic pursuits. The idea of mixing high-end and vintage automobiles with fund raising is reaching heights as evident in the $100,000 USD raised in one night for the Santa Clara Valley Medical Center.

As with any country club, the members require a club house which can serve as a venue for charitable, political, and corporate functions. These facilities offer their owners amenities such as round-the-clock security, automobile-related businesses and concierge services.

References
   MSN Article "A $200,000 condo for your car"

Garages (parking)
Parking
Parking facilities
Condominium